Diva (stylized as DIVA) is the twenty third studio album by Japanese singer Akina Nakamori and final studio album to be released during the 2000s. It was released on 26 August 2009 under the Universal Music Japan label. The album includes music producers from the United States.

The album includes Akina's original written songs "Heartbreak" (under her pseudonym Miran:Miran).

It's the Nakamori's first studio album to be released in both regular ad limited editions. Limited edition includes remixed versions of Diva and Heartache. The original version of Heartache is included only in the single Diva Single Version.

After the album release, Akina suspended her music activities from 2010 until 2014.

Promotion

Singles
It consists of one previously released single.

"Diva Single Version" is the forty seventh single. It was released one month after the album release, on 23 September 2009 under Universal Music Japan. It was her only single to be released in that year and first single to be released in 3 years. The album version of the single was included in the compilation album All Time Best: Originals in 2014. The original version is unreleased as of 2020.

The single debuted at number 50 on Oricon Single Weekly Charts.

Chart performance
The album reached number 29 on the Oricon Album Weekly Chart charted for the 3 consecutive weeks with the sales of 6,900 copies.

Track listing
All tracks are arranged by Satoshi Takebe.

References

2009 albums
Japanese-language albums
Akina Nakamori albums
Universal Music Japan albums